Julidae is a family of millipedes in the order Julida, containing more than 600 species in around 20 genera. Its members are largely confined to the  Western Palaearctic, with only a few species extending into the Oriental and Afrotropical realms. They are united by a characteristic form of the mouthparts, and are classified in the superfamily Juloidea of the order Julida, alongside the families Trichoblaniulidae, Rhopaloiulidae and Trichonemasomatidae.

Genera
The family consists of the following genera:

Select species
Examples of species contained within this family include:

 Brachyiulus pusillus
 Cylindroiulus punctatus
 Tachypodoiulus niger
 Ommatoiulus moreletii
 Megaphyllum unilineatum

References

External links
 
 

Julida
Millipede families